The Coccocarpiaceae are a family of lichen-forming in the order Peltigerales. There are three genera and about 60 species in the family. Species in this family have a widespread distribution, including boreal and austral regions.

Genera
Coccocarpia  – 20 spp.
Peltularia  – 4 spp.
Spilonema  – 4 spp.

References

Peltigerales
Lichen families
Lecanoromycetes families
Taxa described in 1986
Taxa named by Aino Henssen